Shylo Batchelor Ashby Milwood (born 20 March 1996), known professionally as Russ Millions (formerly Russ, Russ Splash or RussMB), is an English rapper. In December 2018 he released his single "Gun Lean" on Virgin Records. The track peaked at number 9 on the UK Singles Chart, becoming the first UK drill track to reach the top 10. Russ Millions has collaborated with Buni, Taze, Tion Wayne, Digga D, Pressa, LD and Dappy.

The dance that Russ performs in the music video became a "dance craze" and was mimicked by footballers including Jesse Lingard. It was ranked by The Guardian at number 10 on their list of "greatest pop music dance crazes".

In April 2019 his follow-up single "Keisha & Becky" with Tion Wayne entered the UK Singles Chart at number 19, and later peaked at number seven. The song was later certified Platinum by the British Phonographic Industry (BPI). As a lead, he had his first number 1 with "Body" alongside Tion Wayne.

Discography

Studio albums
 One of a Kind (2023)

Extended plays 
 Russ Hour (2020)
 My Son: The EP (2020)

Singles

Notes

References

External links 
 

People from Lewisham
Rappers from London
English male rappers
UK drill musicians
Gangsta rappers
Living people

1996 births